Ian James Fantham (born 13 October 1964) is a former English cricketer. Fantham was a left-handed batsman who bowled right-arm medium pace. He was born in Hemel Hempstead, Hertfordshire.

Fantham played 2 Minor Counties Championship matches and 1 MCCA Knockout Trophy match for Hertfordshire from 1993 to 1995. He later joined Bedfordshire in the 1996 Minor Counties Championship against Staffordshire. Fantham played Minor counties cricket for Bedfordshire from 1996 to 2000, which included 18 Minor Counties Championship matches and 9 MCCA Knockout Trophy matches. He made his List A debut for Bedfordshire against Glamorgan in the 1998 NatWest Trophy. He played 2 further List A matches, against Huntingdonshire in the 1999 NatWest Trophy, and Northumberland in the 2000 NatWest Trophy. In his 3 matches, he scored 32 runs at an average of 16.00, with a high score of 32. With the ball he failed to take a wicket, bowling 27 overs without success.

References

External links

1964 births
Living people
Sportspeople from Hemel Hempstead
English cricketers
Hertfordshire cricketers
Bedfordshire cricketers